Aaj Ki Baat is a 1955 Hindi language Bollywood film directed by Leela Chitnis which began filming in 1953 as the first film of her entity "Leela Chitnis Productions", and stars Bipin Gupta, Manmohan Krishna, and Sunder.

Plot

Cast
 Ajit Khan
 Leela Chitnis
 Chitra
 Bipin Gupta
 Manmohan Krishna
 Sunder

Songs
"Kabhi Aap Hanse Kabhi Nain Hanse" - Lata Mangeshkar
"Mohabbat Bane Hai Wo Din Suhane" - Talat Mahmood
"Aaj Ki Raat Dil Me Na Rakhna" - Lata Mangeshkar
"Wo Chali Gham Ki Hawa" - Lata Mangeshkar
"Meri Nagri Me Kyo Aaya" - Asha Bhosle
"Jo Na Mujhse Dekhi Jaye" - Talat Mahmood
"Sukh Gaye Palko Par Aansu" - Talat Mahmood
"Pyar Ki Nazro Se Unko Dekhta Jata Hai Dil" - Talat Mahmood

Reception

References

External links
 Aaj Ki Baat at the Internet Movie Database

1955 films
1950s Hindi-language films
Films scored by Snehal Bhatkar
Indian black-and-white films